Moacir Rodrigues Santos (born 21 March 1970), known as Moacir, is a former Brazilian football player. He has played for Brazil national team.

Club statistics

National team statistics

References

External links

1970 births
Living people
Brazilian footballers
Brazil international footballers
Brazil under-20 international footballers
Brazilian expatriate footballers
Campeonato Brasileiro Série A players
La Liga players
J1 League players
Clube Atlético Mineiro players
Sport Club Corinthians Paulista players
Atlético Madrid footballers
Sevilla FC players
Associação Portuguesa de Desportos players
Ituano FC players
Uberaba Sport Club players
Tokyo Verdy players
Expatriate footballers in Spain
Expatriate footballers in Japan
Association football midfielders
Footballers from São Paulo